Express Wi-Fi is a division within Facebook Connectivity, a group of global internet connectivity initiatives by Meta. As one of several programs under the Facebook Connectivity umbrella, it partners with mobile network operators and internet service providers to provide internet access via public Wi-Fi hotspots that are "fast, affordable, and reliable" (as per Facebook). Facebook assists partners by providing a comprehensive Wi-Fi platform that partners can leverage to better manage and grow their Wi-Fi offerings.

As of October 2020, Express Wi-Fi was active in Ghana, India, Indonesia], Kenya, Nepal, Nigeria, Philippines, South Africa, and Tanzania.

Operating locations and local partnerships

Ghana
Service offered in partnership with Vodafone Ghana in various regions of Ghana.

India
Service offered in partnership with internet service providers AirJaldi, LMES, NetVision, Tikona and Shaildhar. in Rajasthan, Uttrakhand, Gujarat, Mizoram and Meghalaya.

Indonesia
Service is offered in partnership with D~Net, an internet service provider, enabling Facebook and D~NET to establish a presence in city of Surabaya and Sugro, a village in Bromo Tengger Semeru National Park.

Kenya
Service is offered in partnership with SURF, and BRCK since 2019, an internet service provider. Express Wi-Fi was launched in Kenya on March 29, 2017, providing 1000 Wi-Fi hotspots throughout the greater Nairobi area.

Nepal 
Service is offered in Multiple cities of Nepal in partnership with  Worldlink for Kathmandu and Microsoft Nepal for Lalitpur, Bhaktapur, and Bharatpur.

Nigeria
Service offered in partnership with local internet service providers Tizeti.

Philippines
Service offered in partnership with Globe Telecom, a major provider of telecommunications services in the Philippines.

South Africa
Service offered in partnership with CellC, a telecommunication company in South Africa

Tanzania
Service offered in partnership with Habari, an internet service provider.

Technology partners
In August 2018, Express Wi-Fi by Facebook announced a technology partnership program. The program allows access point manufacturers to produce and supply Wi-Fi hardware that is compatible with Express Wi-Fi. Program participants include Cisco Systems, Inc. (to be certified Oct 2019), Arista Networks, Cambium, Edge-core Networks by Accton Technology Corporation, and Ruckus Networks, an ARRIS Company. In February 2019, Nokia announced that Nokia AirScale Wi-Fi platform would also participate in the technology partner program.

In 2020, the Italian software company Tanaza  has joined Facebook Connectivity's Express Wi-Fi Technology Partner Program.

In 2021, Abloomy, a US-based cloud Wi-Fi management software company, has joined Facebook's Express Wi-Fi Technology Partner Program.

References

Facebook
Internet service providers
Bharti Airtel